Club Deportivo Móstoles URJC, formerly CDE El Soto and CD Juventud Móstoles, is a Spanish football team based in Móstoles, in the autonomous community of Madrid. Founded in 1996, it plays in Segunda División RFEF - Group 1, holding home games at Estadio El Soto, which has about 14,000-seat capacity.

History 
CD Móstoles URJC was founded on June 14, 1996, firstly with the name CDE El Soto.
In 2005, the club inked a collaboration agreement with the Universidad Rey Juan Carlos (URJC).

Club background
Club Deportivo Escola El Soto — (1996–99)
Club Deportivo Juventud de Móstoles — (1999–2005)
Club Deportivo Juventud URJC Móstoles — (2005–12)
Club Deportivo Móstoles URJC — (2012–)

Season to season

1 season in Segunda División RFEF
7 seasons in Tercera División

See also
CD Móstoles

References

External links
Official website 

Association football clubs established in 1996
Sport in Móstoles
1996 establishments in Spain
Football clubs in the Community of Madrid